Pictures is a 2019 designer board game by Daniela and Christian Stöhr. It won the 2020 Spiel des Jahres.

In the words of T3 magazine, players "recreate an artsy picture using a bunch of weird components".

Reception 
The game won the 2020 Spiel des Jahres. The jury stated that "Each set provides the player with a different challenge and so there is a huge incentive for experimentation." The reviewers additionally praised the engagement and described the materials as "chosen cleverly".

References

External links

Board games introduced in 2019
Rio Grande Games games
Spiel des Jahres winners